GDP-L-galactose phosphorylase (VTC2, VTC5) is an enzyme with systematic name GDP:alpha-L-galactose 1-phosphate guanylyltransferase. This enzyme catalyses the following chemical reaction

 GDP-L-galactose + phosphate  alpha-L-galactose 1-phosphate + GDP

The enzyme catalyses a reaction of the Smirnoff-Wheeler pathway.

References

External links 
 

EC 2.7.7